Subalaya is a town in the Birmaharajpur subdivision of Subarnapur district, Odisha, India. It is located on an island  in size at the confluence of the Mahanadi river and Surubalijora.

This town is home to Subalaya High School and Subalaya College.

References

Cities and towns in Subarnapur district
Islands of Odisha